Gloucester County Courthouse Square Historic District is a national historic district located at Gloucester Courthouse, Gloucester County, Virginia.  The district encompasses 17 contributing buildings including the Gloucester County government buildings and those structures bordering the square, housing private businesses, offices and residences.  The courthouse was built about 1766, and is a one-story, "T"-shaped brick structure with a hipped roof.  Other notable buildings include the Botetourt Hotel (now the Botetourt Administration Building, c. 1770); the Botetourt Lodge; W. C. Tucker's Department Store Building; S and S Hobbies; and the Kearn's Real Estate storage house.

It was added to the National Register of Historic Places in 1974.

References

External links
Gloucester County Courthouse, U.S. Route 17, Gloucester, Gloucester County, VA: 1 photo at Historic American Buildings Survey
Botetourt Inn & Barn (Ruins), Main Street, Gloucester, Gloucester County, VA: 5 photos at Historic American Buildings Survey

Historic American Buildings Survey in Virginia
County courthouses in Virginia
Courthouses on the National Register of Historic Places in Virginia
Historic districts on the National Register of Historic Places in Virginia
Government buildings completed in 1766
Buildings and structures in Gloucester County, Virginia
National Register of Historic Places in Gloucester County, Virginia